Tatafa is an islet which belongs to ʻUiha island, Tonga. It is located within the Ha'apai Group.

See also
List of lighthouses in Tonga
 List of islands and towns in Tonga

References

Islands of Tonga
Haʻapai
Lighthouses in Tonga